Abhar County is in Zanjan province, Iran. The capital of the county is the city of Abhar. At the 2006 census, the county's population was 158,544 in 41,333 households. The following census in 2011 counted 169,176 people in 49,478 households. At the 2016 census, the county's population was 151,528 in 47,329 households, by which time Soltaniyeh District had been separated from the county to form Soltaniyeh County.

Administrative divisions

The population history and structural changes of Abhar County's administrative divisions over three consecutive censuses are shown in the following table. The latest census shows one district, five rural districts, and three cities.

References

 

Counties of Zanjan Province